Anthony Michael Gennari (alternate name: Antonio; 9 September 1942 – 22 May 2019) was an Italian-American former professional basketball player. At a height of 1.91 m (6'3") tall, he played at the point guard and shooting guard positions.

College career
Gennari played college basketball at Canisius College, where he played with the Golden Griffins, from 1960 to 1964. During his college career, he averaged 14.3 points and 5.7 rebounds per game. As a senior, he averaged 19.0 points and 6.9 rebounds per game. He was inducted into the school's hall of fame, in 1991.

Club career
After his college career, Gennari was selected by the New York Knicks, in the 5th round of the 1964 NBA draft, with the 35th overall pick. However, he never played in the NBA. During his pro club career, Gennari won the 1966 edition of the FIBA Intercontinental Cup, and the 1971–72 season championship of the FIBA European Champions Cup (EuroLeague).

References

External links
NBA.com Draft Profile
Italian League Profile 
Varese Hall of Fame Profile 
RealGM.com Profile
Sports-Reference.com NCAA College Stats

1942 births
2019 deaths
American men's basketball players
AMG Sebastiani Basket players
Basketball players from Buffalo, New York
Canisius Golden Griffins men's basketball players
Fulgor Libertas Forlì players
Italian men's basketball players
New York Knicks draft picks
Pallacanestro Milano 1958 players
Pallacanestro Varese players
Point guards
Reyer Venezia players
Shooting guards